Ali Ibrahim Al-Mazyadi (born 24 September 1985) is a Saudi professional footballer who plays as a goalkeeper for Al-Nahda.

Honours
Saudi Premier League (2): 2007, 2009
Saudi Champions Cup (1): 2011

References

1985 births
Living people
Saudi Arabian footballers
Association football goalkeepers
Ittihad FC players
Al-Fateh SC players
Al-Adalah FC players
Abha Club players
Al-Nahda Club (Saudi Arabia) players
Saudi Professional League players
Saudi Second Division players
Saudi Arabian Shia Muslims